Mangrol may refer to:

Places in western India 
 Mangrol, Kathiawar, a town in the Junagadh district, Gujarat
 Mangrol, Bharuch, a place in Bharuch district in Gujarat
 Mangrol State, a former princely state with seat in the above town, incorporated into Saurashtra State
 Mangrol, Junagadh (Vidhan Sabha constituency), an assembly constituency in Junagadh district, Gujarat
 Mangrol, Surat (Vidhan Sabha constituency), an assembly constituency in Surat district, Gujarat
 Mangrol, Rajasthan, a city and a municipality in Baran district, Rajasthan

Other uses 
 INS Mangrol, an Indian Navy minesweeper